Tor-Arne Moen (born 13 May 1966) is a Norwegian painter and author. He lives in Notodden with atelier in Hydroparken. He's a member of Norske Billedkunstnere, Norwegian Authors' Union and Norske Grafikere.

Moen debuted at Høstutstillingen in 1994. He made the front covers for a re-release of Knut Hamsun's complete works from 1992 to 1994. These paintings are displayed at Tranøy gallery in Hamarøy.

In 1998 he released a collection of short stories, called Høst i sommerfuglhagen (Autumn in the garden of butterflies), and in 2008 he authored the novel Brønnørreten.

Bibliography
 1998: Høst i sommerfuglhagen
 2008: Brønnørreten

Gallery

References

External links

 torarnemoen.com

1966 births
20th-century Norwegian painters
21st-century Norwegian painters
Living people
People from Notodden